Heathi may refer to:

 M. heathi
 Mabuya heathi, Schmidt & Inger, 1951, the Brazilian mabuya, a skink species in the genus Mabuya

Subspecies
 Drasteria hudsonica heathi, a subspecies in the species Drasteria hudsonica

See also 
 Heath, a disambiguation page

External links